Prasonisi ("leek island"), is an islet just off the coast of Crete, near Lambi, in Rethymno regional unit.

See also
List of islands of Greece

Landforms of Rethymno (regional unit)
Uninhabited islands of Crete
Islands of Greece